Ready to the Glory is an EP by the power metal band Avalanch, released in 1993 under the record label Vudu Records. From that recording was only saved to be used on "La Llama Eterna" the song Excalibur.

Track listing
 Intro (0:40)	
 Misery (3:32)
 Ready to the Glory (4:38)
 Red Night (4:08)
 Vencer (3:00)
 Excalibur (4:40)
 Strangers in the night (5:34)
 Treat them fine (3:44)
 The wink of the Moon (04:08)

Personnel
Juan Lozano - vocals
Juan Ángel Aláez - Guitar
Javier de Castro - Guitar
Charly García - Bass
Alberto Ardines - Drums

1993 EPs
Avalanch albums